Atlético Boadilla Fútbol Sala was a futsal club based in Boadilla del Monte, city of the Community of Madrid.

Her pavilion was Pabellón Municipal with capacity of 1,400 seaters.

The main sponsor in its history was Gervasport.

The team played in many localities before its arrival to Boadilla del Monte.

History
The club was founded in 1991 as Club Deportivo Atlanta, and initially, the team played its matches in the Hortaleza neighborhood (Madrid). After a transfer to Algete municipality, the club was finally resettled in Boadilla del Monte. In 2004, the club was merged with CFS Las Rozas to form UD Las Rozas Boadilla, playing its matches in Las Rozas.

Season to season

3 seasons in División de Honor
3 seasons in División de Plata

External links
Atlético Boadilla FS History (Internet Archive)

Futsal clubs in Spain
Futsal clubs established in 1991
Sports clubs disestablished in 2004
1991 establishments in Spain
2004 disestablishments in Spain
Boadilla del Monte
Sports teams in the Community of Madrid